Sijfert Hendrik Koorders (1863 – 1919) was a Dutch botanist, who worked primarily on the flora of Java.

Life 
Koorders was born in Bandung, Indonesia on 29 November 1863. In 1881 he graduated from the Hogere Burgerschool in Haarlem in the Netherlands. He then pursued advanced studies in forestry at the Royal Prussian Forestry and Hunting Academy in Neustadt Eberswalde, as well as attending classes at the University of Tübingen and the National Agricultural School in Wageningen. In 1885 he became a forest officer for the Dutch East Indies Forest Service in Java. In 1892 he became a curator at the Herbarium Bogoriense in Bogor, Java, Indonesia, where he deposited approximately 40,000 specimens. In 1912 he founded the Dutch East Indies Association for Nature Protection.

Legacy 
He is the authority for at least 648 taxa including: 

Several taxa are named in his honor including:
Begonia koordersii Warb. ex L.B.Sm. & Wassh. 
Calamus koordersianus Becc.
Freycinetia koordersiana Martelli
Habenaria koordersii J.J.Sm.
Koordersiella 
Koordersiodendron pinnatum (Blanco) Merr.
Myristica koordersii Warb.
Pandanus koordersii Martelli
Phreatia koordersii Rolfe
Polyscias koordersii (Harms) Frodin
Pomatocalpa koordersii Rolfe J.J.Sm.
Quercus koordersii Seemen
Schefflera koordersii Harms
Trichoglottis koordersii Rolfe

References 

1863 births
1919 deaths
19th-century Dutch botanists